The Consolidated XP4Y Corregidor (company Model 31) was an American twin-engined long-range maritime patrol flying boat built by Consolidated Aircraft for the United States Navy. Only one was built and a production order for 200 was cancelled.

Design and development

The Model 31 was a new flying boat design started in 1938, intended for both military and commercial use.  The aircraft was of all-metal construction with a high-mounted, high aspect ratio cantilever monoplane wing (the Davis wing, which was later used in the B-24 Liberator) and an upswept aft fuselage with a tail unit with twin endplate fins and rudders. It had retractable floats on the undersides of the wings and was powered by two of the new Wright R-3350 radial engines. The civil version could carry seats for 52 passengers, or sleeper accommodation for 28.

The prototype Model 31 first flew on 5 May 1939, demonstrating excellent performance. The Japanese attack on Pearl Harbor on 7 December 1941 brought America into the Second World War just as testing was complete and the United States Navy purchased the prototype, designated XP4Y-1, which was converted into a prototype patrol aircraft, fitted with nose, tail and dorsal gun turrets and 4,000 lb (1,820 kg) of external stores.

A production order for 200 P4Y-1 was placed in October 1942, with a new aircraft plant which had been constructed at New Orleans, Louisiana to build the aircraft.  Delays in preparation of the prototype and the shortage of Wright Duplex Cyclone engines (which were required to power the B-29 Superfortress) led to the production order being cancelled, with the factory being used to build the PBY, instead.

Specifications (XP4Y-1)

See also

References

Notes

Bibliography
 The Illustrated Encyclopedia of Aircraft (Part Work 1982–1985), 1985, Orbis Publishing, Page 1194
 Donald, David, ed. Encyclopedia of World Aircraft (Etobicoke, ON: Prospero Books, 1997), p. 266, "Consolidated (Model 32) B-24 Liberator".
 Green, William. War Planes of the Second World War: Volume Five Flying Boats. London:Macdonald, 1962. .
 Wegg, John. General Dynamics Aircraft and their Predecessors. London:Putnam, 1990. .

Consolidated P4Y Corregidor
P4Y
Cancelled military aircraft projects of the United States
High-wing aircraft
Aircraft first flown in 1939
Twin piston-engined tractor aircraft